Creepshow 2 is a 1987 American comedy horror anthology film directed by Michael Gornick, and the sequel to Creepshow. Gornick was previously the cinematographer of the first film, and the screenplay was written by George A. Romero who was director of the original film with the film starring Lois Chiles, George Kennedy, Dorothy Lamour, and Tom Savini. It was once again based upon stories by Stephen King, and features three more horror segments consisting of "Old Chief Wood'nhead", "The Raft" and "The Hitchhiker".

Unlike the first film, Creepshow 2 only contains three stories instead of five. Originally, two additional stories, Pinfall and Cat from Hell were set to appear in the film, but were scrapped due to budgetary reasons; however, the latter has been filmed for Tales from the Darkside: The Movie. The film was Dorothy Lamour's final film before her death in 1996.

Plot

Prologue
In the small town of Dexter, Maine, a delivery truck pulls up to a newsstand. Billy, a young boy, eagerly follows the truck on his bike. The truck's back shutter opens to reveal the Creep, who drops off copies of the latest issue of Creepshow (which has the same cover as the comic in the final scene of the previous film) before vanishing. Billy picks up an issue and begins to read it.

Old Chief Wood'nhead
Ray and Martha Spruce are an elderly couple who run a small town's general store, whose décor includes a cigar store Indian named "Old Chief Wood'nhead." The Spruces are visited by Benjamin Whitemoon, the elder of a local Native American tribe, who gives them a bag of turquoise jewelry, his tribe's sacred treasures, as collateral for the debt the tribe has incurred.

Later that night, the Spruces are robbed by Benjamin's estranged ne'er-do-well nephew Sam Whitemoon, armed with a shotgun, and his two friends, Andy Cavanaugh and Vince Gribbens. In a struggle, Sam's gun goes off and fires at Martha, killing her. Sam shoots and kills Ray as well before grabbing the jewels & driving away with the others. After they leave, Old Chief Wood'nhead comes to life and goes after the thugs. He shoots Vince with multiple arrows, slaughters Andy with a tomahawk, and uses a hunting knife to scalp Sam. The next morning, Benjamin wakes up to find the turquoise jewelry on his bed. He visits the ruined store to find Old Chief Wood'nhead back on the porch, holding Sam's bloody scalp and a bloodstained knife.

Interlude 1
At the town post office, Billy receives a package from the clerk, Mr. Haig, that supposedly contains a product advertised in his comic: The bulb for a meat-eating Venus flytrap. Billy pays for the package and sets off for home. The Creep appears behind from the post office counter and begins the next story.

The Raft
In mid-October, four college students, Deke, Laverne, Randy, and Rachel, arrive at Cascade Beach, a desolate lake far from civilization, for some fun. While swimming to a wooden raft in the middle of the lake, Randy witnesses a duck being pulled under the water by an unseen force. Once all four students are on the raft, they discover what Randy was so nervous about: a large, black, blob-like creature resembling an oil slick floating on the surface of the water. As Rachel leans over the raft to try and touch the creature, it grabs hold of Rachel, pulls her into the lake, and digests her. The three panicking students remember that it's currently the off-season, meaning that there is no caretaker to rescue them anytime soon.

As time passes, Deke plans to swim to shore so he can bring back help. Before he can make a break for it, however, the blob seeps through the raft's cracks, grabs Deke by the foot, and pulls him through the raft, killing him. Noting that the creature is still hungry, Randy and Laverne manage to evade the creature as it tries to grab them from under the raft. When night falls, Randy and Laverne take turns watching for the creature, then eventually fall asleep in each other's arms.

The next morning, Randy discovers that he and Laverne are still alive. Neglecting to keep an eye on the creature, Randy lays Laverne on the raft and begins kissing and caressing her sleeping body. Laverne then awakens screaming in agony, revealing that the creature has seeped through the cracks and has covered half of her face, much to Randy's horror. As the blob pulls her off the raft and begins consuming her, Randy jumps off the raft to swim to shore. He barely makes it and shouts, "I beat you!" However, the creature rears up from the water like a wave and engulfs Randy.

The blob returns to the lake, leaving no evidence of the students other than their discarded clothes and still-running car. Unknown to the students, there was a sign barely visible behind some thick vegetation that reads "No swimming."

Interlude 2
On his way back home from the post office, Billy is then ambushed by a gang of neighborhood bullies. The gang's leader, named Rhino, takes Billy's package, finds the Venus Flytrap bulb, and crushes it with his foot. In retaliation, Billy kicks Rhino in the groin and flees as the bullies race after him. As Billy escapes, The Creep appears from behind a tree and goes on to tell the last story.

The Hitch-hiker
Annie Lansing, an adulterous Maine businesswoman, wakes up and gets out of bed after sleeping with her gigolo lover. Annie realizes that she only has 15 minutes before her attorney husband George arrives home, so she hops into her car and races for home several miles away. A spilled ember from her cigarette causes Annie to lose control at a slippery corner, where she runs down a Dover-bound hitchhiker. Seeing that no one witnessed the incident, Annie takes off and doesn't look back. Shortly after she leaves, however, the area is crowded with a truck driver, a pair of passersby, and George, who reports the hit-and-run to the police.

Miles away, Annie thinks about what she has done and briefly considers turning herself in but ultimately concludes that no one has anything on her and thinks that everything will be fine. Before she can continue, however, the hitchhiker suddenly appears outside her window and utters "Thanks for the ride, lady!", a line he repeats throughout the story. Annie speeds off in terror, but the hitchhiker reaches through the sunroof and grabs her. She drives off the road and through the woods, where she knocks the hitchhiker off the roof with a low hanging branch. The hitchhiker appears again, opening the door to the passenger seat. Annie shoots him with a revolver multiple times but fails to kill him. She manages to kick him out of the car and run him over repeatedly. The hitchhiker then climbs onto the hood and pulls up his "DOVER" sign, which now reads "You killed me." Annie again loses control of the car and drives off the road, down a hill, and into a tree. Annie repeatedly slams the hitchhiker into the same tree, knocking herself out in the process.

A while later, Annie awakens from her accident. Not seeing the hitchhiker anywhere, Annie believes the experience was all a nightmare, so she gets back on the road and drives home, actually getting there before George. As she begins to step out of her car, the hitchhiker, gruesomely mangled and still uttering "Thanks for the ride, lady!", crawls out from under the car and attacks her. The garage door swings shut as the interior begins to fill with smoke.

Sometime later, George finally arrives home to find Annie in her still-running car, dead from carbon monoxide poisoning. The hitchhiker's bloodied "DOVER" sign sits in her lap.

Epilogue
Inside the delivery truck, the Creep prepares to drive away and bids the audience farewell, but he then spots Billy, still being chased by the bullies. Billy leads his pursuers into a vacant lot swarming with out-of-control plant growth. The bulb Rhino smashed was not the first one Billy had ordered. A quintet of Giant Venus Flytraps emerge from the surrounding weeds and devour all the thugs (though one possibly escapes offscreen).

The Creep cackles in glee and drives off to deliver the latest issue of Creepshow to another town.

In a post-credits scene, the following text appears:

Cast

Wraparound Story
Domenick John as Billy
Tom Savini as The Creep
Joe Silver as The Creep (voice)
Brian Noodt as animation voice
Marc Stephan Delgatto as animation voice
Jason Late as animation voice
P.J. Morrison as animation voice
Clark Utterback as animation voice

Old Chief Wood'nhead
George Kennedy as Ray Spruce
Dorothy Lamour as Martha Spruce
Philip Dore as Curly
Frank Salsedo as Ben Whitemoon
Holt McCallany as Sam Whitemoon
David Holbrook as Fatso Gribbens
Don Harvey as Andy Cavanaugh
Dan Kamin as Old Chief Wood'nhead
Dean Smith as Mr. Cavanaugh
Shirley Sonderegger as Mrs. Cavanaugh
Kaltey Napoleon as Indian #1
Maltby Napoleon as Indian #1
Tyrone Tonto as Indian #2

The Raft
Paul Satterfield as Deke
Jeremy Green as Laverne
Daniel Beer as Randy
Page Hannah as Rachel

The Hitchhiker
Lois Chiles as Annie Lansing
David Beecroft as Annie's Lover
Tom Wright as The Hitchhiker
Richard Parks as George Lansing
Stephen King as Truck Driver
Cheré Bryson as Woman at Accident

Production
Originally, the film was planned to have five stories much like the first film, two of these consisted of Pinfall and Cat from Hell. These two segments, however, were cut from the film due to the film's budget. "Cat from Hell", which would later be used in Tales from the Darkside: The Movie, focused on a wealthy old man hiring a hitman for $100,000 to kill a black cat, which was believed to have killed three other people inside the residence he lives in and fears to be next. Unbeknownst to them, the cat soon exacts cosmic revenge on the two.

"Pinfall", which was set to appear after Old Chief Wood'nhead, told the story of two rivalry teams consisted of the Regi-Men and the Bad News Boors competing in a bowling alley owned by an aged millionaire; the owner is soon killed in a freak accident and the teams found out afterwards that he would award one of them $5 million for whoever got the highest score. Soon, things turn up for the worst of the Regi-Team when the Boors, after they were killed in a fiery car-crash purposely caused by the Regi-Team, return as burnt-up revenants and soon get their revenge on their killers. Unlike Cat from Hell which managed to be brought onto the screen through a different film, Pinfall was never shot and never appeared outside of the film's original script. However, in 2014, the segment was funded through Kickstarter by Dayle Teegarden and was successfully pledged by its backers with £1,231 put into the project against its £1,000 goal. The segment itself was also going to be put into the sequel for Tales from the Darkside: The Movie, but this never came to fruition.

During "The Raft" segment, actor Daniel Beer cited that he had almost died from hypothermia due to the water being very cold. While the crew wanted him to continue working, director Michael Gornick brought him to the hospital, as he feared the actor would leave the set and never return if they forced him to keep working. After a full recovery, he managed to finish the segment.

Release and reception
The film was theatrically released on May 1, 1987. On its opening weekend, it grossed $3,584,077 and has achieved $14,000,000 during its run in theaters.

Janet Maslin of The New York Times wrote that the film "has three suitably grisly ideas that are only glancingly developed. The episodes are marginally interesting, but each is a little too long. And each could be fully explained in a one-sentence synopsis." Todd McCarthy of Variety panned the film as an "omnibus snoozefest which is utterly lacking in chills or thrills," with all three stories "so deficient in imagination and scare quotient they wouldn't pass as even satisfactory episodes on a tv show like Amazing Stories or The Twilight Zone." Kevin Thomas of the Los Angeles Times called the film "a cut-rate sequel from those two popular masters of horror, Stephen King and George Romero, that plays like leftovers. Fans of both deserve better." Richard Harrington of The Washington Post wrote that the film "goes nowhere slowly. Part of the problem is that King's short stories simply work better in print." Allmovie awarded 1.5 stars out of 5 in a retrospective review and stated: "Despite its strengths -- a livelier pace, some creatively gory set-pieces -- this is a much cheaper-looking effort than its predecessor, with the deft guidance of Romero conspicuously absent (long-time collaborator Michael Gornick took up the directorial reins); as a result, King's gross-out sensibilities don't come off as well."

On review aggregator Rotten Tomatoes, it holds a 29% approval rating with a 4.30/10 average rating based on 24 reviews . The site's critical consensus reads, "Not even the melding of Stephen King and George A. Romero's writing sensibilities can elevate this spineless anthology, which is too simple in its storytelling and too skimpy on the genuine scares."

The Blu-ray reviews by Jake Keet and M. Enois Duarte suggests that the film "admittedly not as good as [the first Creepshow]", but it "still makes for a decent follow-up that offers a few amusing moments of horror-comedy".

Home media

After its theatrical release, the film was released on VHS the same year by New World Home Video. While being released by Anchor Bay Entertainment on DVD, a special edition DVD of the film was released with the cover art being a homage to the Tales from the Crypt comic books from EC. In 2013, the film was released on Blu-ray by Image Entertainment on September 3, 2013. On December 13, 2016, Arrow Video released a special edition Blu-ray in the United States. The release contains many interviews with the cast and crew along with behind the scenes footage.

Music and soundtrack
The music to the film was composed and conducted by Les Reed and Rick Wakeman. A soundtrack album was released by Waxwork Records as a double-LP record in the United States in 2017.

Sequel
Creepshow 3 was released in 2006 via Taurus Entertainment who had purchased the naming rights. The film featured no involvement whatsoever from Stephen King or George Romero and was critically panned.

Notes

References

External links

1987 horror films
1980s comedy horror films
1980s monster movies
1980s American films
Adultery in films
American films with live action and animation
American comedy horror films
American horror anthology films
American monster movies
American slasher films
American sequel films
Films based on short fiction
Films based on works by Stephen King
Films set in Arizona
Films set in Maine
Films shot in Maine
New World Pictures films
1980s English-language films